Acacia castanostegia is a shrub belonging to the genus Acacia and the subgenus Phyllodineae. It is native to an area in the Wheatbelt and the Goldfields-Esperance regions of Western Australia.

It blooms in July and produces cream flowers.

See also
 List of Acacia species

References

castanostegia
Acacias of Western Australia
Taxa named by Bruce Maslin